Carol Ng Man-yee (born 24 October 1970) is a Hong Kong political figure, former chairman of the Hong Kong Confederation of Trade Unions, and former member of the Labour Party. She has been actively involved in labor movements over the years, including the "Baggage Gate" incident and the establishment of the British Airways Union. She ran in the 2020 pro-democracy primaries for the Labour Party, losing in the New Territories West constituency. Ng was arrested on 6 January 2021, accused of violating the Hong Kong national security law, after participating in the 2020 Legislative Council primary election, and has been remanded in custody since the end of February.

Biography

Rookie Singing Contest 
In 1990, she participated in the 9th TVB New Talent Singing Competition and was a finalist, performing the song "This is Love" by Lam Cho Kei.

British Airways Hong Kong Staff Union 
In 2003, British Airways unilaterally decided to deduct one-third of the staff's double pay, and after repeated unsuccessful negotiations, the company finally declared: "See you in court, you can go to court if you have the ability." The same year, Ng Man-yee founded the British Airways Hong Kong Cabin Crews Union (BAHKICCA) to claim back the salary deductions from British Airways.

British Airways Discrimination Transoceanic Class Action 
The British Airways Hong Kong Cabin Crew Union was dissatisfied with the employer's unwritten rule that local flight attendants should "retire" at the age of 45. The judge ruled that British Airways' Hong Kong aircrews were working on the aircraft and that the aircraft and its company were registered in the United Kingdom, so British Airways' Hong Kong employees should be protected by British law.

After six years of litigation, British Airways finally yielded before the final appeal and extended the retirement age of Hong Kong aircrew to 65. British Airways Hong Kong ended operations at its Hong Kong base in October 2018, with all 85 employees, including Ng Man-yee, having their contracts terminated immediately.

Baggage Gate Incident 
In the evening of 27 March 2016, Leung Chung Yan, the youngest daughter of then Chief Executive Leung Chun-ying, left her hand luggage outside the restricted area of the airport, and was later allowed by the Airport Authority to be taken into the restricted area by airline staff without the need for "co-passenger inspection". On 17 April, Ng, who was the Chairman of the Airport at the time, staged a sit-in at the airport to demand that the "co-passenger" rule be upheld. Around 2,500 people participated.

On 23 August 2018, the High Court ruled in favor of the Airport. When she met with reporters on the day of the ruling, Ng was moved to tears and said that the "peer-to-peer inspection" rule must be strictly enforced and that no one should be allowed to make exceptions, thanking the people of Hong Kong for their concern and support during the incident.

August 2019 general strike 
On 5 August 2019, people in Hong Kong launched the "three strikes", with an estimated 350,000 people taking part and in which the Confederation of Trade Unions (HKCTU) helped organize. Among them was Ng, then chairwoman of the HKCTU, who said that 95 of its affiliates had launched strikes, and that industries participating in the strikes included the airline industry, buses, retail, catering, financial services and civil servants in the transport sector. In the airline sector, Cathay Pacific Airways needed about 3,000 staff to work every day, and more than 1,500 of them did not attend work, resulting in a large number of flight cancellations; Dragonair needs about 900 people a day, and 500 to 600 of them did not work. There were also no staff at the control tower.

Ng described the strike as a new form of protest for the whole movement, using "peace and reason, not superiority" to continue the movement and bring new thinking to the movement.

Anti-amendment campaign 
Since the 5 August general strike, more and more people in the community organized and participated in unions on their own initiative. Ng said the CTU received many inquiries, including finance, new civil servants, non-contract civil servants, medical, construction and other industries. Ng said that the CTU would help organize more new unions to defend the political and labor rights of Hong Kong's working women.

February 2020 health care workers strike 
The "HA Staff Front" held a strike for five days since early February 2020, demanding the Hong Kong government to close the border completely to fight against the epidemic. Wen Wei Da Gong criticized Ng and the former chairman of the Hong Kong Dragon Airlines Flight Attendants' Association, Anna Shih, for mobilizing health care workers to go on strike.

Pro-democracy Legislative Council primaries and detention 
Ng ran in the 2020 pro-democracy Legislative Council primaries for the Labour Party, losing in the New Territories West constituency. Ng was arrested on 6 January 2021, accused of violating the Hong Kong national security law, after participating in the primaries, and has been remanded in custody since the end of February. She applied for bailed at least twice, withdrawing her application by June 2021. She applied for bail again on 20 December, but her bail was denied, citing her international influence due to her trade union work. She also called for resistance against the authorities after losing the primary election and shown determination to resist against the government.

See also 

 2021 arrests of Hong Kong pro-democracy primaries participants

References 

Living people
1970 births
Hong Kong pan-democrats
Labour Party (Hong Kong) politicians
Hong Kong activists
Prisoners and detainees of Hong Kong
Hong Kong political prisoners